Saundersfoot (Old Welsh: Llanussyllt) is a large village and community (and former electoral ward) in Pembrokeshire, Wales. It is near Tenby, both being holiday destinations. Saundersfoot lies in the Pembrokeshire Coast National Park and on the Pembrokeshire Coast Path. The village population was 3,361 in 2011. while the community had a population of 2,628.

History

Saundersfoot was known in medieval Wales as Llanussyllt, and after the Norman conquest as St Issels (sometimes Issells), both after the parish church dedicated to the Welsh saint Issel. It appeared as Sct. Tissels on a 1578 parish map of Pembrokeshire. Its bishop or abbot was considered one of the seven principal clerics of Dyfed under medieval Welsh law. It was a substantial parish in 1833 with 1,226 inhabitants. John Marius Wilson described the village and parish as St Issells in his 1870–72 Imperial Gazetteer of England and Wales. The church lies in a dell to the north of Saundersfoot and is a grade II* listed building.

Harbour 
Permission to build the harbour was granted by Parliament in 1829 to the Saundersfoot Railway and Harbour Company for the export of anthracite coal from the many mines in the area, although coal was exported from the beach for centuries before this. The village grew up to serve the port which by 1837 had five jetties handling coal and iron ore and subsequently pig iron and firebricks from local sources. The course of the tramway from Bonville's Court mine bisects the village and ends at the jetty. The tramway from Stepaside forms the sea front. The industry finally faded away in the early years of the twentieth century, so that today, the harbour accommodates private moorings, pleasure boats for seasonal tourism, and small fishing charters.

Governance
At the local level, councillors are elected to Saundersfoot Community Council to oversee local issues, such as planning applications and maintenance of the local public buildings and cemetery.

Until 2022 the boundaries of the Saundersfoot community were coterminous with a Saundersfoot electoral ward, electing one county councillor to Pembrokeshire County Council. Councillor Rosemary Hayes MBE was the ward's representative on South Pembrokeshire District Council and Pembrokeshire County Council for 25 years, before losing to Phil Baker at the May 2008 elections.

Following the recommendations of a boundary review by the Local Government Boundary Commission for Wales, effective from the 2022 local elections, the Saundersfoot ward was split into North and South. The north part was merged with the neighbouring community of Amroth to create a new ward of 'Amroth and Saundersfoot North'. The south part became a new county ward of 'Saundersfoot South'. Both wards elect a councillor to the county council.

Railway 
Saundersfoot railway station is a mile from the village centre off the B4316 road.

Saundersfoot swim 
Saundersfoot holds its New Year's Day swim every year which is sponsored by local businesses. More than 1,500 people took part in 2016. Due to COVID-19, the 2021 event was cancelled.

References

External links 
Saundersfoot Harbour and the Wales International Coastal Centre

Carmarthen Bay
Former electoral wards of Pembrokeshire
Coast of Pembrokeshire
Communities in Pembrokeshire
Villages in Pembrokeshire
Seaside resorts in Wales